U.S. Route 27 (US 27) in Kentucky runs  from the Tennessee border to the Ohio border at Cincinnati. It crosses into the state in the Lake Cumberland area, passing near or through many small towns, including Somerset, Stanford, and Nicholasville. The road then passes straight through the heart of Lexington, including past the University of Kentucky (UK) and Transylvania University. North of Lexington it passes through Cynthiana and Falmouth before entering Campbell County and passing through many Northern Kentucky suburbs before ending at the Ohio state line on the Taylor Southgate Bridge in Cincinnati.

Route description
US 27 crosses into Kentucky entering the Daniel Boone National Forest in the Strunk community, just south of Pine Knot. Heading north, US 27 turns into a four-lane highway in Burnside. US 27 is the main highway running through Somerset. The route continues as a four-lane highway almost to the Pulaski-Lincoln county line, and again has four lanes through Stanford. It veers northeast to Lancaster then northwest to the site of Camp Dick Robinson at KY 34, becoming four-lane. Entering Jessamine County, the road crosses the Kentucky River. It westerly bypasses the central business district of Nicholasville. Once in Fayette County, US 27 turns into a six-lane highway passing many shopping destinations in Lexington. Passing The Summit at Fritz Farm, Fayette Mall, and Lexington Green, Nicholasville Road is one of the busiest roads in Lexington. The road becomes South Limestone Street upon reaching Cooper Drive. At the University of Kentucky's UK hospital complex it turns west on four-lane Virginia Avenue, then joins US 68 (Broadway) for its northeasterly journey through Lexington's central business district and the horse-farm country of Fayette and Bourbon counties. The conjoined routes separate on the north side of Paris, where 27 splits from the town bypass and heads north to Cynthiana, Falmouth and Newport. It then crosses the Ohio River into Cincinnati.

Major intersections

References

External links

 

027
 Kentucky
Transportation in McCreary County, Kentucky
Transportation in Pulaski County, Kentucky
Transportation in Lincoln County, Kentucky
Transportation in Garrard County, Kentucky
Transportation in Jessamine County, Kentucky
Transportation in Lexington, Kentucky
Transportation in Bourbon County, Kentucky
Transportation in Harrison County, Kentucky
Transportation in Pendleton County, Kentucky
Transportation in Campbell County, Kentucky